While Passing Along This Way is an album of American musicians Norman Blake and Nancy Blake, released in 1994. It was nominated for a Grammy Award for Best Traditional Folk Album.

Track listing 
 "He's Passing This Way" (Wade Mainer) – 3:12
 "I'm Going to Leave Old Dixie" – 4:09
 "Bonaparte Crossing the Rhine/Going Down the Valley" (Traditional) – 4:42
 "The Grave of Bonaparte" (Blake, Traditional) – 4:36
 "On & On & On" (Blake, Blake) – 3:06
 "The Greenwood Tree" (Traditional) – 1:52
 "Sweeet Freedom" (Traditional) – 3:45
 "Sweet Heaven" (Traditional) – 2:26
 "God's Radio Phone" (Mainer) – 4:36
 "Old Mother Flanagan" (Blake, Traditional) – 3:03
 "Last Train from Poor Valley" (Blake, Blake) – 3:44
 "Hangin' Dog" (Blake) – 2:47
 "The Fate of Talmage" (Traditional) – 3:36
 "Old Stepstone" (Blake, Traditional) – 3:53

Personnel
Norman Blake – guitar, mandolin, vocals
Nancy Blake – guitar, mandolin, vocals

References

1994 albums
Norman Blake (American musician) albums